Plympton  is an inner south-western suburb of Adelaide, South Australia. The name is believed to have been given by Henry Mooringe Boswarva to a private subdivision in the area, naming after his home town in Devon, England. It was accepted as an official name for the suburb in 1944.

Of irregular shape, the suburb straddles parts of Marion Road, Cross Road and Anzac Highway. To the east of Marion Road it is bounded by the former Holdfast Bay railway line (northwest), Gray and Beckman Streets (east), and the Glenelg tram line (south). To the west of Marion Road it is bounded Mooringe Avenue (north), Streeters Road and Whelan Avenue (west), and the Glenelg tram line (south).

The remnants of the Holdfast Bay railway line can be found in Plympton's West Side cycleway.

Plympton is in the City of West Torrens local government area; the South Australian House of Assembly districts of Badcoe and Morphett; and the Australian House of Representatives divisions of Hindmarsh and Adelaide.

History
Plympton Post Office opened on 7 October 1856.

In 1896 a "plumpton" track was established in the area by the Plympton Coursing Company. The Adelaide Plumpton Coursing Club was formed in 1908, with John Creswell as president, to control dog racing at Plympton. The track and adjacent polo grounds later came to be called "Birkalla", after the nearby railway station, though the name "Plympton Plumpton" lingered on.

Prior to WWII Birkalla was the home of the Adelaide Hunt Club's kennels.

In popular culture
Plympton is referred to in the song "Plympton High" from the 1993 album True Believers by John Schumann of Redgum.

References

Suburbs of Adelaide